Olivier Assayas (born 25 January 1955) is a French film director, screenwriter and film critic. Assayas is known for his slow-burning period pieces, psychological thrillers, neo-noirs and French comedies. His work has become associated with the film movement known as the New French Extremity and he has frequently collaborated with Juliette Binoche and Kristen Stewart. The son of filmmaker Jacques Rémy, Assayas began his career as a critic for influential magazine Cahiers du Cinéma. Here he wrote about the World Cinema and its film auteurs who would later influence his own works. Assayas made several shorts, and then made the leap from writer to screenwriter.

He made his directorial film debut with Disorder in 1986. He continued directing films, with Cold Water (1994) becoming a breakthrough film in his career. It would be his first film to be screened at the Cannes Film Festival in the Un Certain Regard section. His follow up film Irma Vep (1996) also screened at Cannes, while Sentimental Destinies (2000), Demonlover (2002), and Clean (2004) all officially competed for the Palme d'Or.  In 2006, he contributed a short film to the anthology film Paris, je t'aime (2006) with fellow directors such as Alexander Payne, Coen Brothers and Alfonso Cuarón. He gained acclaim with his dramas Summer Hours (2008), Clouds of Sils Maria (2014) and Personal Shopper (2016); the latter won him the Cannes Film Festival Award for Best Director. He has also directed the comedy Non-Fiction (2018) and the spy thriller Wasp Network (2019).

Life and career
Assayas was born in Paris, France, the son of French director/screenwriter Raymond Assayas, alias Jacques Rémy (1911–1981). His father was of Turkish-Jewish origin who had settled in Italy, while his mother, Catherine de Károlyi, was a fashion designer of Protestant Hungarian origin. Assayas started his career in the industry by helping his father. He ghostwrote episodes for TV shows his father was working on when his health failed. In a 2010 interview, Assayas stated that his main political influences when growing up were Guy Debord and George Orwell. Speaking of the 1968 May uprising to overthrow General de Gaulle, Assayas in the same interview stated: "I was defined by the politics of May '68, but for me May '68 was an anti-totalitarian uprising. People seemed to forget that at the occupied Odéon theater, you had crossed flags-black and red, and I was on the side of the black element."

He made his debut in 1986, after directing some short films and writing for the influential film magazine Cahiers du cinéma.

Assayas's film Cold Water was screened in the Un Certain Regard section at the 1994 Cannes Film Festival.

His biggest hit to date has been Irma Vep, starring Hong Kong star Maggie Cheung, which manages to be a tribute both to French director Louis Feuillade and to Hong Kong cinema.

While working at Cahiers du cinéma, Assayas wrote lovingly about European film directors he admires but also about Asian directors. One of his films, HHH: A Portrait of Hou Hsiao-hsien, is a documentary about Taiwanese filmmaker Hou Hsiao-hsien.

He married Cheung in 1998. They divorced in 2001, but their relationship remained amicable, and in 2004 Assayas made his film Clean with her.

He met actress-director Mia Hansen-Løve when Hansen-Løve, seventeen at the time, starred in Assayas's 1998 feature Late August, Early September, but "[they] didn't get together until [she] was 20". They separated in 2017.

In 2009 and 2010, Assayas signed two petitions in support of director Roman Polanski, who had been detained while traveling to a film festival in relation to his 1977 sexual abuse charges, which the first petition argued would undermine the tradition of film festivals as a place for works to be shown "freely and safely", and that arresting filmmakers traveling to neutral countries could open the door "for actions of which no-one can know the effects."

He directed and co-wrote the acclaimed 2010 French television miniseries Carlos, about the life of the terrorist Ilich Ramírez Sánchez. Venezuelan actor Édgar Ramírez won the César Award for Most Promising Actor in 2011 for his performance as Carlos.

In April 2011, it was announced that he would be a member of the jury for the main competition at the 2011 Cannes Film Festival.

His 2012 film, Something in the Air, was selected to compete for the Golden Lion at the 69th Venice International Film Festival. Assayas won the Osella for Best Screenplay at Venice. His 2014 film Clouds of Sils Maria was selected to compete for the Palme d'Or in the main competition section at the 2014 Cannes Film Festival. Sils Maria won the Louis Delluc Prize and garnered six César Award nominations including Best Film, Best Director, and Best Original Screenplay. The film won a César Award for Best Supporting Actress for American actress Kristen Stewart. In 2016, Assayas won Best Director Award (Cannes Film Festival) for Personal Shopper, which also starred Kristen Stewart.

In June 2017, it was announced that Assayas would preside over the 2017 70th anniversary Locarno Film Festival.

Style and influences
In an interview with Nick Pinkerton of Reverse Shot, Assayas talked about his influences:

Assayas participated in the 2012 Sight & Sound directors' poll, where he listed his ten favorite films as follows: 2001: A Space Odyssey, The Gospel According to St. Matthew, Ludwig, A Man Escaped, Mirror, Napoléon, Playtime, The Rules of the Game, The Tree of Life, and Van Gogh.

Filmography

Film 

As a writer only
Passage secret (1985)
Rendez-vous (1985)
L'Unique (1986)
Scene of the Crime (1986)
Avril brisé (1987)
Filha da Mãe (1990)
Alice and Martin (1998)
Based on a True Story (2017) - Co-written with Roman Polanski

Television

Short films

Awards and nominations

References

Further reading
 Olivier Assayas, A Post-May Adolescence. Letter to Alice Debord, FilmmuseumSynemaPublikationen Vol. 17, Vienna: SYNEMA - Gesellschaft für Film und Medien, 2012, 
 Kent Jones (Ed.), Olivier Assayas, FilmmuseumSynemaPublikationen Vol. 16, Vienna: SYNEMA - Gesellschaft für Film und Medien, 2012,

External links

 
 
 
 New York Times article on Assayas
 Bringing Down the House: A Conversation with Olivier Assayas, The Notebook, mubi.com

1955 births
Living people
Film directors from Paris
Sorbonne Nouvelle University Paris 3 alumni
Cannes Film Festival Award for Best Director winners
Georges Delerue Award winners
French people of Greek-Jewish descent
French people of Turkish-Jewish descent
French Sephardi Jews
Mizrahi Jews
French screenwriters
French film critics
Postmodernist filmmakers